Alavanyo Kpeme is a village in the Hohoe District of the Volta Region of Ghana.

References

Populated places in the Volta Region